Laternea is a genus of fungus in the family Phallaceae. The genus was first described by French botanist Pierre Jean François Turpin in 1822. It contains two species found in tropical regions of the Americas.

Species

References

External links

Phallales
Agaricomycetes genera